Sanjabad-e Sharqi Rural District is in the Central District of Khalkhal County, Ardabil province, Iran. At the census of 2006, its population was 4,842 in 1,054 households; there were 4,240 inhabitants in 1,108 households the following census of 2011; and in the most recent census of 2016, the population of the rural district was 3,207 in 973 households. The largest of its 16 villages was Lonbar, with 921 people.

References 

Khalkhal County

Rural Districts of Ardabil Province

Populated places in Ardabil Province

Populated places in Khalkhal County